The number of women in the United States judiciary has increased as more women have entered law school, but women still face significant barriers in pursuing legal careers.

History

Women faced significant barriers in entering the legal profession in the US. In 1875, for instance, the Wisconsin Supreme Court denied Lavinia Goodell admission to the state bar on the grounds that "[n]ature has tempered woman as little for the juridical conflicts of the court room, as for the physical conflicts of the battle field. Womanhood is moulded [sic] for gentler and better things

In June 1869, the Iowa Supreme Court ruled that Arabella Mansfield could not be denied a chance to take the bar exam because she was a woman. She took the exam and passed, becoming the first licensed female lawyer in the United States.

In 1872, the United States Supreme Court affirmed a decision from the Supreme Court of Illinois that denied Myra Bradwell admission to the state bar.  The state Supreme Court had reasoned that because state law invalidated any contract entered into by a married woman without the consent of her husband, women (most of whom would be married) could not adequately represent their clients.  The U.S. Supreme Court affirmed, noting that even though some women might not actually be married, such women were the rare exceptions. The U.S. Supreme Court noted:

Also in 1872, the Utah Bar admitted its first two women, Phoebe Couzins and Georgianna Snow.

In 1873, Belva Lockwood was admitted to the Washington, D.C., bar after a yearlong dispute. In 1878, Clara Shortridge Foltz became the first woman to be admitted to practice law in the state of California. To do so, she had to lobby the state legislature to remove the gender restriction in the law. Nonetheless, after her legislative success, she was still denied admission to the state's Hastings College of law on the grounds that women would "distract the attention of the male students". Ms. Foltz only gained admission to the state school after arguing her case to the California Supreme Court.

In Washington D.C., Belva Lockwood lobbied Congress on three separate occasions to change the U.S. Supreme Court admissions rules to allow a woman to argue before the court.  Her efforts succeeded. Lockwood was sworn in as the first woman member of the U.S. Supreme Court bar on March 3, 1879. Late in 1880, she became the first woman lawyer to argue a case before the U.S. Supreme Court.

Even as women began to practice law, there were still few female judges. In 1884, the District of Columbia trial court appointed Marilla Ricker to the position of United States Commissioner.   In 1886, the first woman to graduate from Pennsylvania Law School was appointed master in chancery for the city of Philadelphia.   By 1907, Evanston, Illinois elected a woman, Catherine Waugh McCulloch to serve as a justice of the peace.

Mary Bartelme was appointed judge assistant in Cook County, Illinois in 1913, where she presided over court cases involving juveniles and was referred to at that time as, "America's only woman judge", by The New York Times.  In 1914, Georgia Bullock was appointed the "woman judge" of Los Angeles, in charge of a court segregated by sex where "she would serve as a model of Victorian ideals of womanhood for female misdemeanants".

Ratified in 1920, the Nineteenth Amendment granted women the right to vote. During this time, women began assuming judgeships, through both appointment and election. One such woman was Mary O'Toole, who became the first woman municipal judge of the United States, when she was appointed Judge of the Municipal Court of Washington, D.C. by President Harding in 1921. In 1925, the first female lawyer in California, Clara Shortridge Foltz, was considered for a federal judgeship at the age of 76. Florence E. Allen became both the first woman to be elected to the positions of general jurisdiction court in 1920 and the first female state appellate judge through her election to the Ohio Supreme Court in 1922. She later became the first female federal appellate judge, appointed to the 6th Circuit in 1933. The Los Angeles Women's Judge Georgia Bullock was finally appointed to an 'official' judgeship in 1931. The first female judge to serve on a federal district court, Burnita Shelton Matthews, was appointed in 1949 to the United States District Court for the District of Columbia.

Barring women from practicing law was prohibited in the U.S. in 1971. In 1975, Julia Cooper Mack was appointed to the D.C. Court of Appeals, making her the first woman of color, and only the eighth woman total, to be appointed to a court of last resort. By 1993, 60 women had served on the highest court in forty states, the District, and the federal courts.   As of 2001, women filled 26.3% of the judgeships on state courts of last resort, 19.2% of federal district court judgeships, 20.1% of federal appellate judgeships, and as of 2018, 33.3% of the U.S. Supreme Court.

In 1981, Sandra Day O'Connor was the first woman appointed to the U.S. Supreme Court. She received unanimous Senate approval. Justice Sandra Day O'Connor, commenting on women pursuing careers, observed that "women professionals still have primary responsibility for the children and the housekeeping, spending roughly twice as much time on these cares as do their professional husbands."

In 1992, the United States Court of Appeals for the Sixth Circuit convened the first federal all-female three-judge panel, composed of Sixth Circuit judges Alice M. Batchelder and Cornelia Groefsema Kennedy, alongside the Eastern District of Michigan's Anna Diggs Taylor, sitting by designation.

Gender bias and barriers to entry in the US courts
In the 1980s and 1990s, women began to experience an increase in their access the courts, as employees, judges, and court-users.  This increase in access, along with a renewed interest in uncovering underlying discrimination, led many courts to consider the experience that women were having in the traditionally male-dominated court system.  In the early 1980s the National Organization for Women Legal Defense and Education Fund and the National Association of Women Judges banded together to push the state and federal courts to review a perceived bias against women that they believed existed in the courts.   From 1982 to 1984, the New Jersey Supreme Court created and ran the nation's first official Task Force on Women in the Courts to "investigate the extent to which gender bias exists in the New Jersey judicial branch, and to develop an education program to eliminate any such bias".   The task force found "significant gender bias," prompting the New Jersey Chief Justice to order the task force to continue its work indefinitely.   The New Jersey report garnered significant public attention and prompted other states to consider similar studies in their own judicial branches.

At a 1988 joint meeting of the Conference of Chief Justices and the Conference of State Court Administrators the participants formulated resolutions directing each chief justice to create a task force in his or her jurisdiction to study "gender bias and minority concerns".   This effort resulted in a comprehensive overview of issues impacting women in the various state judiciaries.  Starting in 1992 with the U.S. Court of Appeals for the Ninth Circuit, the federal judiciary followed suit and sought to investigate any gender bias that might exist in the courts and seek ways to remedy the problems.   The progress made by these courts was almost terminated in 1995, when the new Republican majority that swept into Congress under the Contract with America sought to cut off funding that had been provided to run these task forces on the federal level.   The new majority "believed that bias task forces by the federal judiciary were both unnecessary and undesirable".   However, the appropriation remained intact and tasks forces, such as Chief Judge Sloviter's Third Circuit Task Force, could continue to pursue their charters.

Since 1992, women's representation in law school classes has approached 50%. However, the percentage of female federal judges is fairly lower.  As of 2016, only 36% of judges on the federal courts of appeals were women, that is 60 out of 167 active judges.  Women represented only 15% of judges on the Third Circuit, only 20% of judges on the Eight Circuit and only 25% of judges on the Tenth Circuit.  As for women of color, there is even a smaller number. Only 12 women (7% of judges) of color were on the U.S. courts of appeals.

In addition to other task forces, the Ninth Circuit's report found that many women believe that a major hindrance to attaining a judicial position is the lack of women "power players" in the connected "old boys' clubs" that often influence judicial appointments. Women judges and women lawyers attribute male-domination of the judiciary in large part to the exclusion of women from the networks that influence judicial appointments. Women lawyers attribute the small number of women appointed to bench and bar committees to the exclusion of women from formal and informal selection processes. A large proportion of women lawyers believe that men have a better chance than women to be promoted to law firm partnerships and to equivalent positions in public law organizations. (See Sandra Day O'Connor, The Effects of Gender in the Federal Courts: The Final Report of the Ninth Circuit Gender Bias Task Force: The Quality of Justice, 67 S. Cal. L. Rev. 745, 786-87 (1994).)

Inappropriate interactions
Many of the task forces found both explicit and implicit unacceptable treatment of female lawyers by male judges.  For instance, in 1988, a senior status federal district court judge refused to address a female attorney as 'Ms.' and threatened to hold her in contempt if she persisted in using her birth name rather than her married name. Women judges also report hearing more disparaging remarks than male judges do.

See also
 Women in law
 Women in the workforce
 Female state supreme court justices
 Ada Kepley, 1847-1925 - first woman to graduate from a law school in the United States (1870)

References

Articles
 Sandra Day O'Connor, The Challenge of a Woman in Law, WOMEN IN LAW 5 (Shimon Shetreet, ed. 1998).
 Sandra Day O'Connor, The Effects of Gender in the Federal Courts: The Final Report of the Ninth Circuit Gender Bias Task Force: The Quality of Justice, 67 S. Cal. L. Rev. 745 (1994).
 Rose Elizabeth Bird, Forward, WOMEN IN THE COURTS ix (1978).
 Beverly Blair Cook, Women Judges: The End of Tokenism, WOMEN IN THE COURTS 84 (Winifred L. Hepperle & Laura Crites eds., 1978).
 Beverly Blair Cook, Moral Authority & Gender Difference: Georgia Bullock & the Los Angeles Women's Court, 77 JUDICATURE 144 (1993).
 Walter J. Walsh, Speaking Truth to Power: The Jurisprudence of Julia Cooper Mack, 40 HOW. L. J. 291, 296 (1997).
 Lynn Hecht Schafran, Gender Bias in the Courts: An Emerging Focus For Judicial Reform, 21 Ariz. St. L.J. 237 (1989).
 Resnick, Ambivalence: The Resiliency of Legal Culture in the United States, 45 Stan. L. Rev. 1525 (1993).
 Judith A. Baer, WOMEN IN AMERICAN LAW 290 (1996).
 Felice K. Shea, Women on the Bench, 12 Colum. J. Gender & L. 361, 379-380 (2003).
 Dolores K. Sloviter, Personal Reflections on Creation of the Third Circuit Task Force on Equal Treatment in the Courts, 42 Vill. L. Rev. 1347, 1352 (1997).
 Byrna Bogoch, Courtroom Disclosure and the Gendered Construction of Professional Identity, 24 L. & Soc. Inquiry 329, 334 (1999).
 Joyce S. Sterling, The Impact of Gender Bias on Judging: Survey of Attitudes Toward Women Judges, 22 COLO. LAW. 257 (Feb. 1993
 Jeffrey Toobin, Women in Black, NEW YORKER, at 48 (Oct. 30, 2000).
 Belva Ann Lockwood, "My Efforts to Become a Lawyer", Lippincott's Monthly Magazine, February 1888.
 See articles about women attorneys by Barbara Babcock, Jill Norgren, and Mary Clark
 See articles posted on the Stanford University Law School Women and Law website

Studies
 American Bar Association, Commission on Women in the Profession (2003), available at Women in the Profession.
 Conference of Chief Justices, Resolution XVIII, "Task Forces on Gender Bias and Minority Concerns," (adopted Aug. 4, 1988)
 Conference of State Court Administrators, Resolution I, "Task Forces on Gender Bias and Minority Concerns," (adopted Aug 4. 1998)).
 Carrol Seron, Ph.D. et al., A Report Of The Perceptions And Experiences Of Lawyers, Judges, And Court Employees Concerning Gender, Racial And Ethnic Fairness In The Federal Courts Of The Second Circuit Of The United States, 1997 Ann. Surv. Am. L. 419, 457 (1997)

Cases
 In re Goodell, 39 Wis. 232, 245 (1875)
 Bradwell v. Illinois, 83 U.S. 130, 141 (1873) "Mrs. Myra Bradwell, residing in the State of Illinois, made application to the judges of the Supreme Court of that State for a license to practice law. She accompanied her petition with the usual certificate from an inferior court of her good character, and that on due examination she had been found to possess the requisite qualifications. Pending this application she also filed an affidavit, to the effect 'that she was born in the State of Vermont; that she was (had been) a citizen of that State; that she is now a citizen of the United States, and has been for many years past a resident of the city of Chicago, in the State of Illinois.' And with this affidavit she also filed a paper asserting that, under the foregoing facts, she was entitled to the license prayed for by virtue of the second section of the fourth article of the Constitution of the United States, and of the fourteenth article of amendment of that instrument." Bradwell v. Illinois is at 83 U.S. 130 (1872).

Books
 J. Clay Smith, ed., Rebels in Law: Voices in History of Black Women Lawyers (University of Michigan Press, 1998)
 Jill Norgren, Belva Lockwood: The Woman Who Would be President (New York University Press, 2007).
 Jill Norgren, Equal Rights Pioneer: Belva Lockwood (for young readers)(Lerner Books, August 2008).
 See books by Virginia Drachman

American women lawyers
 
Legal history of the United States
Women in the United States